Pennsylvania Route 417 (PA 417) is a  state highway located in Venango County in Pennsylvania.  The southern terminus is at US 322 in Franklin.  The northern terminus is at PA 8 in Cherrytree Township.

Route description

PA 417 begins at an intersection with US 322 on the border of the city of Franklin and the borough of Sugarcreek, heading northeast on two-lane undivided Rocky Grove Avenue into Sugarcreek. The road passes through residential areas prior to turning north into forests and becoming an unnamed road. The route continues through a mix of woodland, farmland, and rural residences, heading into Oakland Township and curving northeast. PA 417 continues through more rural areas, passing through Dempseytown before forming a brief concurrency with PA 428 near Baums Corners. At this point, the route turns more to the east through more areas of farms and forests with some homes. PA 417 turns to the northeast and crosses into Cherrytree Township, continuing to its terminus at PA 8.

Major intersections

See also

References

External links

Pennsylvania Highways: PA 417

417